The Levant Crisis, also known as the Damascus Crisis, the Syrian Crisis, or the Levant Confrontation, was a military confrontation that took place between British and French forces in Syria in May 1945 soon after the end of World War II in Europe. French troops had tried to quell nationalist protests in Syria at the continued occupation of the Levant by France. With heavy Syrian casualties, British Prime Minister Winston Churchill opposed French action and sent British forces into Syria from Transjordan with orders to fire on the French if necessary.

British armoured cars and troops then reached the Syrian capital of Damascus, following which the French were escorted and confined to their barracks. With political pressure added, the French ordered a ceasefire. The crisis almost brought Britain and France to the point of war.

Background

At the beginning of the 20th century, Syria and Lebanon were two Arab states occupying a region known as the Levant and were part of the Ottoman Empire. After the Ottoman defeat there in World War I and as a result of the Treaty of Sevres, they were then ruled under a French mandate given by the League of Nations at the Paris Peace Conference in 1919.

In 1936, Syria signed a treaty with France which provided Syrian independence. However, with the breakout of World War II this never happened as the French feared that Nazi Germany would capitalise if France relinquished its colonies in the Middle East. Riots thus broke out and the new President Hashim al-Atassi resigned. With the fall of France in 1940, Syria came under the control of Vichy France until the British and Free French occupied the country in the Syria–Lebanon campaign in July 1941. Syria proclaimed its independence again in 1941, but it was not until 1 January 1944 that it was recognised as an independent republic. For several months after both Lebanon and Syria had seen demonstrations against the French. With more and more French reinforcements having arrived, the demonstrations soon escalated.

Charles de Gaulle as head of the French Provisional Government sent General Paul Beynet to establish an air base in Syria and a naval base in Lebanon in April 1945. News of this provoked more nationalist protests in Damascus. On Victory in Europe Day, both countries saw huge protests, in which some French nationals were attacked and killed. The French responded to these protests with threats of artillery and air strikes in an effort to stop the movement towards independence. Talks ceased immediately, and skirmishes took place between the Arabs and the French and Senegalese forces while Syrian and Lebanese soldiers deserted their French officers.

Crisis
The crisis began proper on 19 May when demonstrations in Damascus involved firing on the grounds of the French hospital; about a dozen people were injured but none were killed. The next day serious rioting broke out in Aleppo in which a number of French soldiers were killed and some injured. In retaliation General Oliva-Roget ordered his troops to open fire on demonstrators in Damascus. Within several days the fighting escalated between Syrian youths and the French army in Hama and Homs.

On 29 May, French troops stormed the Syrian parliament and tried to arrest the President Shukri al-Quwatli and the speaker Saadallah al-Jabiri but both managed to escape. The French burned, bombarded the building and then cut off Damascus's electricity. They also sealed off Syria's borders with Jordan, Iraq and Lebanon. The French began shelling with artillery and mortars while colonial Senegalese troops were sent in, who committed acts of looting and wanton destruction.

Having managed to escape via a British armoured car, Quwatli sent an urgent request to Prime Minister Winston Churchill for British troops to intervene. Churchill said he would do what he could, but his relationship with Charles de Gaulle was at a low ebb following his visit to Paris the previous year, in spite of his efforts to preserve French interests following the Yalta conference. In January Churchill told a colleague that he believed that de Gaulle was "a great danger to peace and for Great Britain. After five years of experience, I am convinced that he is the worst enemy of France in her troubles ... he is one of the greatest dangers to European peace. ... I am sure that in the long run no understanding will be reached with General de Gaulle".

General Bernard Paget, who was in charge of the British Ninth Army reminded the French they fell under his command. De Gaulle had thought this ended with the war over in Europe but would actually terminate once the Pacific War had ended. Paget had a large force in the region at his disposal and threatened that he would be forced to intervene from the Transjordan if the violence did not stop. Churchill agreed but needed the backing of the United States and the Soviet Union in which to send British troops against the French.

At the same time, the French Army of the Levant in the region had been severely weakened—nearly 70 percent of all officers and 40 percent of Syrian soldiers in the French army had deserted their posts and taken up arms with the Syrian rebels. In Hama two French aircraft were downed, while the commander of a French unit was ambushed and killed. In Hauran French troops were rounded up and disarmed — their weapons distributed to young men hoping to march towards Damascus to help the central government. The French then called in for reinforcements and were now using their air force to drop bombs on suspected areas of resistance. At the same time the Syrian Prime Minister Faris al-Khoury was at the founding conference of the United Nations in San Francisco, presenting Syria's claim for independence and also ordered the fighting to stop. They were both backed by President Harry Truman, who declared "those French ought to be taken out and castrated".

British intervention
Finally, on 31 May, with news that the casualty toll had exceeded a thousand Syrians, Churchill sent de Gaulle a message saying, "In order to avoid a collision between British and French forces, we request you immediately order French troops to cease fire and withdraw to their barracks". This was ignored and Churchill the next day without waiting for a response from the Americans authorised Paget to invade.

On 1 June, Paget ordered his force to invade Syria from Transjordan, with troops and tanks of the 31st Indian Armoured Division. They struck towards Damascus with 'D' Squadron of the Kings Dragoon Guards having rolled into Beirut, from which they cut the communications of Oliva-Roget. Paget ordered Oliva-Roget to tell his men to cease fire, but the latter said that he would not take orders from the British even though Paget was his superior officer and Commander of Middle East Command. Paget then advanced towards Damascus. Oliva-Roget realised he was heavily outnumbered, and ordered his men back to their base near the coast. He was angry that the British had arrived only after he had "restored order". He told a Syrian journalist, "You are replacing the easygoing French with the brutal British". That night, with the Syrians killing any French or Senegalese troops they could find, the French were forced to accept the British escort back to the safety of their barracks at gunpoint.

The British then had to mop up any of the French that had still not returned to their barracks much to the cheers of the people of Damascus. The damage to the city was considerable; the Syrian parliament building was a smouldering shell, a large area of the town had been destroyed by fire and the streets were pitted with shell holes.

The Manchester Guardian reported the event with patriotic delight:

On 2 June, De Gaulle realized nothing could be done and reluctantly arranged a ceasefire - Oliva-Roget was later sacked, but a furious row broke out between Britain and France.

Ceasefire and diplomacy
Once Paget had taken control of Damascus he then imposed a curfew on all French citizens. French soldiers were kept in their barracks and were not allowed to fire their weapons except in self-defence under the watchful eyes of British guns. French ships were to stay out of gun range out to sea and not to move in unless told to. French aircraft were grounded with British troops guarding the airfields. British and Indian troops and tanks then spread all over Syria as there were still small mopping up operations to be done.

The next day with the ceasefire in place—two troops of 'A' Squadron of the Kings Dragoon Guards encamped on the Damascus race course, they escorted high-ranking French officers who were otherwise unable to move about the town safely. By 12 June 'A' Squadron KDG went to Baalbek in the Bekaa valley and on 2 July 'B' Squadron was sent to Tel Kalakh to resupply a French garrison which had been cut off. Two troops of 'B' Squadron, known as Mannforce, went on 6 June to Latakia where the French had fired at a crowd, killing nineteen. On 10 July Mannforce, together with the 2nd Sherwood Foresters, were called to Baniyas when the French opened fire on the town with mortars and machine guns. With control restored there Lieutenant Mann then took a party to the Turkish frontier to bring back the horses and French officers of their Cavalry unit, whose men had deserted. By this time order was restored in the majority of Syria.

Beynet was furious and labelled the British measures as a "stab in the back". De Gaulle raged against 'Churchill's ultimatum' saying that, "the whole thing stank of oil". The British ambassador to France Duff Cooper was summoned by the French foreign minister Georges Bidault saying "whatever mistakes France had made she did not deserve such humiliation as this". De Gaulle saw it as a heinous Anglo-Saxon conspiracy: he told Cooper, "I recognise that we are not in a position to wage war against you, but you have betrayed France and betrayed the West. That cannot be forgotten."

Quwatli was informed that British troops were in control of Syria; they requested Quwatli's cooperation in enforcing an evening curfew in the country. Quwatli complied and expressed his gratitude to the British government.

Aftermath

Continuing pressure from Syrian nationalist groups and the British intervention forced the French to withdraw completely from Syria to Lebanon by the end of July and by this time the Mandate had effectively been erased. The British force took a more prominent role in the policing of Syrian cities and designated tribal areas over the Summer and Autumn of 1945.

France was isolated and was suffering yet another diplomatic crisis—the third one of 1945, after Stuttgart and the Val D'Aosta both of which had infuriated Truman. The secretary of the Arab League Edward Atiyah said, "France put all her cards and two rusty pistols on the table". The French saw the British intervention as a way to bring the Levantine states into its own sphere of influence. There were accusations in the French press that Britain had armed the demonstrators and that Britain was an enemy of France having made another example of herself as perfide albion. They also accused the United States of helping Italy and Germany more than it helped France during the war. The Soviets made it clear that France was in the wrong but De Gaulle criticised them as well. The UK and the US had viewed the French military action in Syria as a potential catalyst for further unrest throughout the Middle East and a detriment to British and American lines of communication in the region.

In October, the international community recognized the independence of Syria and Lebanon and were admitted as founding members of the United Nations. On 19 December 1945 an Anglo-French agreement was eventually signed – both British from Syria and French forces from the Lebanon were to be withdrawn by early 1946. The French evacuated the last of their troops in April of that year whilst the British left in July. Syria became fully independent on 17 April 1946 which left both countries in the hands of a republican governments that had been formed during the mandate.

Bidault labelled the whole crisis worse than that of the Fashoda incident fifty years earlier.

See also
 Fashoda syndrome
 France–United Kingdom relations

References

Bibliography
 
 
 
 
 
 
 
 
 
 
 
 
 
 
 

France–United Kingdom military relations
Military history of Lebanon
Military history of Syria
1945 in France
Lebanon under French rule
French Mandate for Syria and the Lebanon
Conflicts in 1945
1945 in Lebanon
France–Syria relations
France–Lebanon relations
1945 in Mandatory Syria
Resistance to the French colonial empire
Attacks on legislatures